Like You Know It All (lit. "You Think You Know It All But You Don't") is a 2009 South Korean comedy-drama film written and directed by Hong Sang-soo.

Plot 
Arthouse filmmaker Goo can't seem to direct a hit, but at least the critics love him. He goes to Jecheon, North Chungcheong Province to judge the local film festival, but the common practice for jurors is to schmooze by day, drink at night, and sleep through movies. He bumps into an old friend Boo Sang-yong in town and drinks till he passes out, but not before soundly offending his friend's wife.

After Jecheon, Goo heads to Jeju Island to give a college lecture. There, he meets up with a former mentor, who it turns out is now married to Goo's ex-unrequited lover.

Cast 
 Kim Tae-woo as Goo Kyeong-nam, a film director

In Jecheon 
 Uhm Ji-won as Gong Hyeon-hee, a programmer of the film festival
 Gong Hyung-jin as Boo Sang-yong, Kyeong-nam's ex-business partner
 Jung Yu-mi as Yoo Shin, Sang-yong's wife
 Seo Yeong-hwa as Oh Jin-sook, an actress and jury member for the film festival
 Eun Joo-hee as Oh Jeong-hee, a porn actress
 Kim Yeon-soo as a box office hitting film director 
 Michael Rodgers as film critic 'Robert'

In Jeju 
 Go Hyun-jung as Go Soon, Cheon-soo's wife and Goo's ex-unrequited lover.
 Moon Chang-gil as Yang Cheon-soo, a painter and Kyeong-nam's college senior
 Ha Jung-woo as a sculptor and Cheon-soo's neighbor
 Yoo Jun-sang as Mr. Go, a chief officer of Jeju Film Commission
 Go Chang-gyoon as an officer of Jeju Film Commission
 Ye Soo-jung as Mother of actress

Production 
Like You Know It All is Hong's second film to be shot on HD video following his previous feature Night and Day, released in 2008. The film was produced independently with a short shooting period and low budget of $100,000, with the cast — some of whom have appeared in Hong's earlier films — working without any fees upfront. Shooting commenced in Jecheon, August 2008, where the real-life Jecheon International Music & Film Festival is held annually, before moving to Jeju Island, where filming continued into September.

A member of the main production staff said, "the film steps away from the sharp beauty of cinematic form, trying to make some changes while being more loose in form but more dynamic
in atmosphere. It is more hilarious but also bitter at the same time."

YesAsia said, "Hong's characteristic episodic narrative and elliptical reflection provide the brooding framework for a bitingly funny send-up of filmmakers, festivals, and the people and places in between."

References

External links 
  
 
 
 
 
 

2009 films
2009 comedy-drama films
South Korean independent films
South Korean comedy-drama films
Adultery in films
Films about film directors and producers
Films set in Jeju
Films shot in Jeju
Films directed by Hong Sang-soo
Sponge Entertainment films
2000s Korean-language films
2009 independent films
2000s South Korean films